In aviation, a non-towered airport is an airport without a control tower, or air traffic control (ATC) unit. The vast majority of the world's airports are non-towered. In the United States, there are close to 20,000 non-towered airports compared to approximately 500 airports with control towers. Airports with a control tower without 24/7 ATC service follow non-towered airport procedures when the tower is closed but the airport remains open, for example at night.

Operations 
At non-towered airports, instead of receiving instructions from an air traffic controller, aircraft pilots follow recommended operations and communications procedures for operating at an airport without a control tower. The exact procedures vary from country to country, but they may include standard arrival and departure procedures, as well as a common communications phraseology by radio transmissions over a common frequency. For example, a common traffic advisory frequency (CTAF) is recommended for radio communication and is used in the United States, Canada, New Zealand and Australia. 

Non-towered airports may lie inside or underneath controlled airspace. In that case, some or all aircraft arriving and departing require clearances from a remote air traffic control unit, such as terminal or center control, even though there is no control tower managing landings and takeoffs. Pilots may be able to obtain those clearances by radio, by phone, or through a company dispatcher or local flight service station; in some cases, departing aircraft (IFR or VFR) take off and level out below the floor of controlled airspace, then radio for a clearance before climbing further.  Some countries establish low-altitude VFR corridors for non-towered airports in large urban areas so that VFR arrivals and departures can avoid controlled airspace altogether.

MTAF 
Some countries, such as Canada and Norway, use mandatory frequency airports (MF) or mandatory traffic advisory airports (MTAF), which operate like towered airports in some ways: the radio operators (typically a flight service station) still issue only advisories, but aircraft are required to make radio contact with the ground station before operating in the airport's control zone.

UNICOM 
Many non-towered airports have radio to ground operations such as UNICOM to assist aircraft arriving, departing, or maneuvering on the ground. These radio operators such as from fixed-base operators have no authority to give aircraft clearances or instructions, but they can issue advisories to let them know about weather conditions, runway conditions, traffic, and other concerns.

Temporary towers 
A mobile airport traffic control tower (MATCT) is a temporary tower in an area with an immediate increase in air traffic density. This may be due to wildfire suppression operations carrying out aerial firefighting.  

For special events such as fly-ins, temporary towers may operate for only several days each year at fields that are otherwise non-towered. Temporary towers may operate out of an existing airport building, an RV, or even simply a chair (with a portable transmitter and binoculars).

Criteria 
When the traffic volume at an airport gets too high for safe and efficient operations, or when the mix of aircraft types and speeds becomes too large, an airport may be considered for a tower. However, it is also necessary to find the money to construct a building and pay the controllers' salaries; in some cases aviation regulations or local opposition may prevent establishment of the unit.

Risk 
Hazards are created by failure to use radios to report positions and intentions when operating within the airspace, which can lead to collisions between aircraft unaware of each other. In 1996, an incoming United Express Flight 5925 collided with a King Air aircraft, which failed to report its intent to take off on a common traffic advisory frequency at non-towered Quincy Airport in Illinois. Some pilots fail to use the correct runway at non-towered airports.

See also
Air traffic control
Pilot-controlled lighting

References

Airports by type